The men's rings competition at the 1936 Summer Olympics was held at the Waldbühne on 10 and 11 August. It was the sixth appearance of the event. There were 111 competitors from 14 nations, with each nation sending a team of up to 8 men. The event was won by Alois Hudec of Czechoslovakia, the nation's first victory after winning two silver medals and two bronze medals in 1924 and 1928. Leon Štukelj was the silver medalist in Berlin, the second man to earn two medals in the rings after his 1928 gold. Host Germany took a bronze medal, its first in the rings since 1896, as Matthias Volz finished third.

Background

This was the sixth appearance of the event, which is one of the five apparatus events held every time there were apparatus events at the Summer Olympics (no apparatus events were held in 1900, 1908, 1912, or 1920). Six of the 14 gymnasts from 1932 returned: fifth-place finisher Oreste Capuzzo and sixth-place finisher Franco Tognini of Italy, seventh-place finisher Heikki Savolainen and fourteenth-place finisher Mauri Nyberg-Noroma of Finland, and twelfth-place finisher István Pelle and thirteenth-place finisher József Hegedűs of Hungary. Alois Hudec of Czechoslovakia was the reigning (1934) world champion.

Austria, Bulgaria, and Romania each made their debut in the men's rings. The United States made its fifth appearance, most of any nation, having missed only the inaugural 1896 Games.

Competition format

The gymnastics format returned to the aggregation format used in 1928 but not in 1932. Each nation entered a team of eight gymnasts (Bulgaria had only 7). All entrants in the gymnastics competitions performed both a compulsory exercise and a voluntary exercise, with the scores summed to give a final total. The scores in the rings were added to the other apparatus scores to give individual all-around scores; the top six individual scores on each team were summed to give a team all-around score. No separate finals were contested.

The compulsory exercise was described in the Official Report (dashes indicate "clearly perceptible" pauses):

Schedule

Results

References

Men's rings
1936
Men's 1936
Men's events at the 1936 Summer Olympics